"Orphans" is a song by British rock band Coldplay from their eighth studio album Everyday Life. It was released on 24 October 2019, along with the single "Arabesque" and appears on the second side of the album Sunset. The song was written by the band members and produced by The Dream Team.

Background and promotion
On 24 October 2019, the band announced the release (on the same day) of the songs "Arabesque" and "Orphans" as a dual release and as the first singles off Everyday Life. About the content of the songs, lead singer Chris Martin said in an interview with BBC Radio 1 that "some of it’s very personal, about real things in my life, and some of it’s about things that I see or we see, and some of it’s about trying to empathise about what other people are going through". On the day of the release, the band set up a timer counting down to the release of the songs.

The subject matter of the song includes the plight of refugees of the Syrian civil war. Martin told the BBC, “It seems to me that one of the things that might help people have a better time is to put themselves in other people’s shoes, whether that’s these kids who have to leave Syria, or who grew up in Baltimore, or whatever it might be. Rather than judging from afar, maybe to  think ‘I wonder what it’s like to be there.'” Coldplay donated 10% of the worldwide proceeds from the song to the refugee charity Hopeland.

Recording
The song was recorded last-minute during the mixing of the album Everyday Life, for which it served as one of two lead singles.

Music video
The song's music video, directed by Mat Whitecross, premiered on 25 October 2019. The music video shows the development of the song from its earliest roots, a voice memo by Chris Martin in which the singer is heard talking about the tuning of his guitar before playing what would become the song's main riff, to the fully polished song that was released. The music video won an award at the 2020 MTV VMAs for 'Best Rock' music video.

Reception 
Billboard (#93) and NME (#41) included the track on their "Best Songs of 2019" lists.

Live performances
The song was performed live for the first time during NBC's Saturday Night Live on 2 November 2019. In a rehearsal, Martin explained to the dancers who accompanied the band's performance, "This song is about, you see all these pictures of young people like you and a bit older people like us, having to leave their countries and everyone calls them refugees or migrants rather than just people. So we were thinking about, this could be any of us who is in these camps or at the border or whatever. And that's what this song’s about, it's like people like us saying, 'I just want to go home and be normal.'" "Orphans" was later played live on the Annie Mac Show on BBC Radio 1 on 27 November 2019 along with "Arabesque", "Everyday Life", "Lovers in Japan", and "Guns".

Personnel
Credits adapted from the "Orphans / Arabesque" liner notes.

 Guy Berryman – bass guitar
 Will Champion – drums, percussion, backing vocals
 Jonny Buckland – guitar
 Chris Martin – guitar, vocals

 Aluna – choir vocal
 Garine Antreassian – choir vocal
 Jocelyn 'Jozzy' Donald – choir vocal
 Nadeen Fanous – choir vocal
 Marwa Kreitem – choir vocal
 Apple Martin – choir vocal
 Max Martin – keyboards
 Moses Martin – choir and backing vocal
 Bashar Murad – choir vocal
 Ben Oerlemans – choir vocal
 Bill Rahko – choir vocal
 Norah Shaqur – choir vocal
 Rik Simpson – keyboards

 Daniel Green – producer
 Emily Lazar – mastering
 Max Martin – producer, programming
 Bill Rahko – producer
 Rik Simpson – producer

 Erwan Abbas – assistant engineering
 Chris Allgood – assistant mastering
 Matt Glasbey – assistant engineering
 Pierre Houle – additional engineering
 Matt Latham – assistant engineering
 Baptiste Leroy – assistant engineering
 Bastien Lozier – additional engineering
 Issam Murad – assistant engineering
 Anthony De Souza – assistant engineering
 Federico Vindver – additional engineering

Charts

Weekly charts

Year-end charts

Certifications

Release history

References

2019 singles
2019 songs
Charity singles
Coldplay songs
Parlophone singles
Songs written by Chris Martin
Songs written by Guy Berryman
Songs written by Jonny Buckland
Songs written by Will Champion
Music videos directed by Mat Whitecross